Sam Bailey (born 1977) is an English singer who won the tenth series of The X Factor in 2013.

Sam Bailey may also refer to:

 Sam Bailey (coach) (1924–2010), American football, basketball, and baseball coach
 Samuel Bailey (1791–1870), British philosopher
 Sam Bailey (director), American writer and director
 Samantha Bailey (born 2001), American child actress
 Sam Bailey Building, a historic school building in Griffin, Georgia, U.S.

See also
 Sam Bayley (1878–?), English footballer